This article is about the particular significance of the year 1812 to Wales and its people.

Incumbents
Lord Lieutenant of Anglesey – Henry Paget, Earl of Uxbridge (until 13 March); Henry Paget, 1st Marquess of Anglesey (from 28 April) 
Lord Lieutenant of Brecknockshire and Monmouthshire – Henry Somerset, 6th Duke of Beaufort
Lord Lieutenant of Caernarvonshire – Thomas Bulkeley, 7th Viscount Bulkeley
Lord Lieutenant of Cardiganshire – Thomas Johnes
Lord Lieutenant of Carmarthenshire – George Rice, 3rd Baron Dynevor 
Lord Lieutenant of Denbighshire – Sir Watkin Williams-Wynn, 5th Baronet    
Lord Lieutenant of Flintshire – Robert Grosvenor, 1st Marquess of Westminster 
Lord Lieutenant of Glamorgan – John Stuart, 1st Marquess of Bute 
Lord Lieutenant of Merionethshire - Sir Watkin Williams-Wynn, 5th Baronet
Lord Lieutenant of Montgomeryshire – Edward Clive, 1st Earl of Powis
Lord Lieutenant of Pembrokeshire – Richard Philipps, 1st Baron Milford
Lord Lieutenant of Radnorshire – George Rodney, 3rd Baron Rodney

Bishop of Bangor – Henry Majendie 
Bishop of Llandaff – Richard Watson
Bishop of St Asaph – William Cleaver 
Bishop of St Davids – Thomas Burgess

Events
20 June - Creation of The Kidwelly and Llanelli Canal and Tramroad Company.
Summer - Percy Bysshe Shelley stays at Nantgwyllt in the Elan Valley with his wife Harriet.
September - Rioting occurs at Nefyn over enclosures.
17 September - The celebration of the completion of the embankment, later known as the 'Cob' in Porthmadog
30 December - A brig, the Fortune, is wrecked on The Smalls, Pembrokeshire, with the loss of 10 or 11 lives.
1 October - Balloonist James Sadler flies over the north Wales coastline in an unsuccessful attempt to cross the Irish Sea.
Opening of:
Monmouthshire and Brecon Canal between Newport and Brecon.
Aberdare branch of Glamorganshire Canal.

Arts and literature

New books

English language
Felicia Hemans - The Domestic Affections and Other Poems
Benjamin Millingchamp - A Sermon preached at St. Peter's Church, Carmarthen, on Thursday, July 4, 1811
The New Flora Britannica (with illustrations by Sydenham Teak Edwards)

Welsh language
Lewis Hopkin - Y Fêl Gafod
Hugh Jones - Arwyrain Amaethyddiaeth

Music
Owen Dafydd - Ballad of the Brynmorgan Explosion

Births
6 January - Catherine Glynne, future wife of William Ewart Gladstone (d. 1900)
3 February - Robert Elis (Cynddelw), poet and lexicographer (d. 1875)
3 April - Henry Richard, pacifist politician (d. 1888)
19 May - Lady Charlotte Guest, translator and philanthropist (d. 1895)

Deaths
15 January - Theophilus Jones, historian, 52
13 March - Henry Bayly Paget, 1st Earl of Uxbridge, Lord Lieutenant of Anglesey, 77
May - Thomas Owen, clergyman and translator, 62
27 November (bur.) - Jane Cave, poet, c. 58

References

 
 Wales